Niddrie is an unincorporated place and railway point in Unorganized Kenora District in northwestern Ontario, Canada. It is on the Canadian National Railway transcontinental main line, between Morgan to the west and Amesdale to the east, has a passing track, and is passed but not served by Via Rail transcontinental Canadian trains.

References

Communities in Kenora District